John Burger (April 10, 1916 – January 11, 2005) was an American politician, businessman, and lawyer.

Born in Lafayette, Indiana, Burger served in the United States Army Air Forces during World War II and became a lieutenant colonel. He graduated from Goodland High School. Burger received his bachelor's degree from Indiana University and his law degree from University of Minnesota Law School. He was an educator and management consultant for the Dale Carnegie Institute and worked at General Mills. Burger lived in Long Lake, Minnesota. Burger was a lawyer and accountant. He served in the Minnesota House of Representatives as a Republican from 1983 until 1990. Burger died in California of pneumonia.

Notes

1916 births
2005 deaths
People from Long Lake, Minnesota
People from Lafayette, Indiana
Indiana University alumni
University of Minnesota Law School alumni
United States Army Air Forces officers
Businesspeople from Minnesota
Minnesota lawyers
Republican Party members of the Minnesota House of Representatives
20th-century American politicians
United States Army Air Forces personnel of World War II
20th-century American businesspeople
20th-century American lawyers
Military personnel from Minnesota